tradeKorea is Korea-based online B2B platform for global trade. It is operated by KITA (Korea International Trade Association), the largest business organization in Korea and which runs World Trade Center Seoul.

History 
tradeKorea launched in April 2008 to strengthen overseas marketing efforts at small and midsize exporters.  It is owned and operated by KITA (Korea International Trade Association) where global buyers and suppliers feel free to connect with Korean companies for their business needs.

Services 
tradeKorea.com shows a multitude of enterprises of every size and description looking for trading partners across borders. The latest buying and selling leads, trade statistics, online trade show are available.

The site also engages trade experts who match companies according to their specific requirements.

With no membership fees ,  tradekorea.com aims to be a one-stop shopping experience for companies trading internationally. It also offers business consulting services to navigate the entire Korean trade process.

See also 
 B2B
 Korea International Trade Association
 ecommerce

References

External links 
 tradeKorea (Official Website)
 KITA Homepage

Internet properties established in 2008
World Trade Center Seoul
Online marketplaces of South Korea